The Town and Country Planning (Scotland) Act 1997 is the principal piece of legislation governing the use and development of land within Scotland. The act's forerunner was the Town and Country Planning (Scotland) Act of 1972.

The 1997 act is supported by various pieces of subordinate legislation, such as the Town and Country Planning (General Development Procedure) (Scotland) Order 1992, the Town and Country Planning (General Permitted Development) (Scotland) Order 1992, and the Town and Country Planning (Use Classes) (Scotland) Order 1997.

More recently, and following a white paper on Modernising the Planning System, the Scottish Parliament passed the Planning etc (Scotland) Act 2006, which sought to amend certain parts of the 1997 Act; including development plan preparation, development control, now known as development management in Scotland, and enforcement. These changes came into force on 3 August 2009 and amended the 1997 Act, which still remains the principal planning act in Scotland.

One change brought in by the 2006 Act was the formation of a Strategic Development Planning Authority to prepare a strategic development plan in each of the four city regions.

See also 
Grampian condition
Town and country planning in the United Kingdom
Planning and Compulsory Purchase Act 2004
Strategic Development Planning Authority

References

External links
Town and Country Planning (Scotland) Act 1997
Town and Country Planning (Use Classes) (Scotland) Order 1997
Town and Country Planning (General Permitted Development) (Scotland) Order 1992
Planning etc. (Scotland) act 2006
Town and Country Planning (Scotland) Act 1972
Modernising the Planning System, Scottish Government
BBC News Online, 'Scotland: Planning concerns'
Age rule on new housing estate

Town and country planning in Scotland
United Kingdom Acts of Parliament 1997
Housing in Scotland
1997 in British law
1997 in Scotland
Acts of the Parliament of the United Kingdom concerning Scotland